Ebikibina John Ogborodi is currently the acting registrar of National Examination Council, NECO, since 3 June 2021 until July 2021.

Early life and education 
Ebikibina John Ogborodi is a native of Sagbama, Bayelsa State. In 1986, he graduated from University of Jos. In 1999, he received a master's degree in learning disability from the same University of Jos.

Career 
Ogborodi joined NECO in 1999. He has served as an acting director, examination development department, acting director, office of the registrar and general services and director, human resource management.

Acting registrar of NECO 
Ogborodi was appointed the acting registrar of NECO to replace Godswill Obioma who died on 31 May 2021. Until his appointment, he was the director, special duties.

References 

Living people
People from Bayelsa State
University of Jos alumni
Year of birth missing (living people)